Boulder Peak is a  mountain summit located in Blaine County, Idaho, United States.

Description
Boulder Peak ranks as the 127th-highest peak in Idaho and is part of the Boulder Mountains which are a subset of the Rocky Mountains. The mountain is situated 15 miles northwest of Ketchum, Idaho, in the Sawtooth National Recreation Area on land managed by Sawtooth National Forest. The peak is easily seen from Highway 75, and is the most visible of the Boulder Mountains. Precipitation runoff from the mountain's slopes drains to the Big Wood River via Boulder Creek. This landform's toponym has been officially adopted by the United States Board on Geographic Names.

Climate
Based on the Köppen climate classification, Boulder Peak is located in an alpine subarctic climate zone with long, cold, snowy winters, and cool to warm summers. Winter temperatures can drop below −10 °F with wind chill factors below −30 °F.

See also
 List of mountain peaks of Idaho
 Easley Peak

References

External links
 Boulder Peak: Idaho: A Climbing Guide
 National Geodetic Survey Data Sheet
 Boulder Peak: weather forecast

Mountains of Idaho
Mountains of Blaine County, Idaho
North American 3000 m summits
Sawtooth National Forest